Ricardinho (born 27 December 2005) is a Portuguese professional footballer who plays for CD Mafra.

Club career 
Called to the first team by Ricardo Sousa in the early 2021–22 season, Ricardinho enjoyed a few bench appearances while aged 15, before making his professional debut on the 2 February 2022, as he replaced Gui Ferreira in the last minutes of a 2–0 Liga Portugal 2 away loss to Leixões. On that occasion, he became the youngest ever footballer to play in Portugal's second tier, surpassing André Almeida's record.

References

External links

2005 births
Living people
Portuguese footballers
Portugal youth international footballers
Association football midfielders
People from Mafra, Portugal
C.D. Mafra players
Liga Portugal 2 players
Sportspeople from Lisbon District